The Drowned World Tour (billed as Drowned World Tour 2001) was the fifth concert tour by American singer-songwriter Madonna in support of her seventh and eighth studio albums Ray of Light (1998) and Music (2000), respectively. The tour began on June 9, 2001, in Barcelona, Spain and ended in Los Angeles, California on September 15. It was her first tour in eight years, following The Girlie Show in 1993. Set to start in 1999, it was delayed until 2001 as Madonna filmed and starred in the movie The Next Best Thing (2000), began working on Music, gave birth to her son Rocco and married Guy Ritchie.

When the tour was finally decided, there was little time, so in just three months, auditions for dancers were held, musicians and technicians were hired and rehearsals took place. Madonna appointed Jamie King choreographer while French designer Jean Paul Gaultier, who had worked with the singer in the past, was in charge of the tour's wardrobe. Gaultier created the outfits in such way that they indicated different phases of Madonna's career. The poster and logo for the tour included references to Kabbalah, which Madonna was studying at the time. Like the singer's previous tours, the show was divided into different thematic segments: Rock 'n' Roll Punk Girl, Geisha Girl, Cyber Cowgirl, and Spanish Girl/Ghetto Girl. The set list consisted mainly of songs from Ray of Light and Music, with "Holiday" and "La Isla Bonita" being the only pre-1990s singles she performed.

The show was appreciated by critics, who lauded the staging and production. Nonetheless, the lack of Madonna's 1980s songs left some dissatisfied. Drowned World was a commercial success; grossing more than US$76.8 million ($ million in  dollars), and playing to over 730,000 fans in sold-out shows throughout Europe and the United States, it became 2001's highest-grossing concert tour by a solo artist. At the 2001 Pollstar awards, it was nominated for Major Tour of the Year and Most Creative Stage Production, but lost them both to U2. The concert on August 26 at The Palace of Auburn Hills in Michigan was filmed professionally and broadcast live on HBO as Madonna Live: The Drowned World Tour; afterwards, it was released on VHS and DVD under the title Drowned World Tour 2001.

Background 
After the release of her seventh studio album, Ray of Light (1998), Madonna stated in an interview on Larry King Live in January 1999 that she was involved in an upcoming movie titled The Next Best Thing. Filming lasted from April to June 1999, with Madonna initially planning to tour during the second half of the year, stating that once filming was completed she would "rehearse to go on tour. And then I'll probably play up until the millennium". However, said plans fell through and the tour was pushed back to 2001; this was due to the fact that she had, in her own words, "been distracted by having children and filming movies". By 2000, Madonna was in a relationship with English director Guy Ritchie; their son Rocco was born in August 2000, her eighth studio album, Music, was released that September and, three months later, her and Ritchie married in Scotland. In November 2000, Madonna stated that she was eager to go on tour again: "I've already got ideas [...] of stuff I'd like to do for a big tour. I feel like it's time. I need to take a trip around the world and sing a few songs". The tour was officially announced by the singer's publicist Liz Rosenberg in April 2001.

Her first concert tour since 1993's The Girlie Show, time was short and Madonna had to prepare everything within three months; auditions for dancers took place in New York in March and April and were personally supervised by the singer and dancer Christian Vincent. Jamie King was appointed creative director and the tour's official choreographer; King recalled that the tour "was so hectic that I suffered from depressions and fell considerably ill". Madonna had begun taking guitar lessons in 2000 with Monte Pittman and played both acoustic and electric guitar in four of the show's numbers. Other personnel included Madonna's backup singers and dancers of 14 years Niki Haris and Donna De Lory, Ron Powell on percussions, Steve Sidelnyk on drums and French house music expert Stuart Price as bassist and keyboards player; the latter went by the moniker Jacques Lu Cont and had worked with the singer on remixes of Music. In the end, the troupe was made up of ten dancers, two backup singers and six musicians; rehearsals went on for five days a week, thirteen hours a day. Clair Brothers Audio support was roped in for providing a mixture of high-tech techno sound and fusion of acoustic and trance. Madonna later clarified: "I don't see the point of doing a show unless you offer something that is going to mind-boggle the senses. It's not enough to get on stage and sing a song. It's all about theatre and drama and surprises and suspenses".

The Drowned World Tour officially began at Barcelona's Palau Sant Jordi on June 9, 2001, and ended at the Staples Center in Los Angeles in September; it was originally scheduled to kick off with two shows in Cologne's Kölnarena, but said concerts had to be canceled due to technical difficulties; as a result, 35,000 tickets were refunded. The show on August 3 at New Jersey's Continental Airlines Arena was also cancelled, this time due to illness, reducing the dates from fifty to forty-seven.

Development 

The tour took its name after J. G. Ballard's 1962 novel The Drowned World and Madonna's 1998 single of the same name. Liz Rosenberg stated that it would be her "grandest spectacle to date". In May 2001, AOL, the tour's main sponsor, offered its subscribers advance tickets to the US shows before they went on sale to the general public. Like Madonna's previous tours, Drowned World was divided into different thematic segments: Rock 'n' Roll Punk Girl, Geisha Girl, Cyber Cowgirl, and Spanish Girl/Ghetto Girl; each of these segments represented a phase of Madonna's career. The singer herself said that she envisioned the show as "a theatrical representation of my music [...] I have taken my inspiration from many things — martial arts, flamenco, country, punk, rock and roll, dance, and circus". The set list consisted mainly of songs from Music and Ray of Light; among her pre-1990s singles, only "Holiday" (1983) and "La Isla Bonita" (1987) were included. Entertainment Weekly reported that this was Madonna's choice, as she didn't want to do a "'Solid Gold' hit parade". The tour's production manager Mark Spring said in an interview for The Independent that it was the "most complicated thing" he had ever done. He further elaborated: "The [Madonna] mystique figures very highly, so you have a whole other level of professionalism you have to attain. [It's] not that you wouldn't do your best, of course. But this is Madonna. Her show is perfect. There are no mistakes".

Two Boeing 747 aircraft were needed to ferry the tour from Europe to the United States, and 300 cargo vehicles were used for transporting over 100 tons of equipment. The stage was "the size of three tennis courts" and described by Spring as "a machine on the move". A vast electrical grid, composed of truss sections, chain motors, electrical cables and the control devices that linked electronically or mechanically with the performances happening, was hung from above; four video screens formed the backdrop of the stage. Other material included a mechanical bull and equipment designed for aerial movements. The sets were built in sections made by three companies. A permanent crew of one hundred persons, ranging from lighting, sound and carpenters to dancers, wardrobe and make-up, was hired. Monitor mixing was handled by four monitor engineers, with two of them for Madonna's monitors. Blake Suib, one of the engineers, commented that Madonna was a perfectionist, as she could tell when a sound coming from the speakers sounded bad or good during rehearsals. By suggestion of music director Pat Leonard, they tried out using 14 kHz of sound frequency in their live speakers, which was unusual to use at the time. They also came up with the idea of using isolated amplifiers to pick up the individual sound of each instruments. Suib commented that "the creative process of coming up with new ideas, implementing them, and then soberly evaluating their results was time-consuming but worth it".  Dave Kob, FOH engineer for the tour, explained:
"The show is extremely technical, extremely fast-paced, and the variety of music is amazing. [...] It goes from screaming heavy metal to techno dance, to Country and Western; there's even a flamenco hootenanny where everyone comes down front, beats on logs and plays acoustic guitars and pennywhistles. Then it goes back to 'Holiday' which is an old dance number. It keeps you steppin'. Madonna sings everything live. She's been that way from the beginning of her career, even with all the athletic dancing. She's a hard worker and she expects everybody else to work as hard or harder. I respect that.
Designer Jean Paul Gaultier was signed up to create the costumes for the tour; his designs had a fusion of punk and Scottish fashions, geisha, cowboy and Spanish themes. These included torn shirts and zippered black pants, a nod to Madonna's early days; black wigs and white makeup that referenced the geisha aesthetic used on "Nothing Really Matters" (1999); leather chaps over jeans like the ones she wore on her "Don't Tell Me" music video, and a "hybrid" of clothes from the "La Isla Bonita" music video and the 1996 musical Evita. Brothers, Dean and Dan Caten, creators of the DSquared2 fashion line, contributed with ghetto fabulous costumes, which represented the phase of Madonna's career at that time. Stylist Arianne Phillips, who had worked with Madonna on the past, oversaw the costumes, designing some and collaborating on others with Gaultier. Three exact copies of the outfits Madonna wore in each segment were created, while only two copies were made for the dancers' clothes. The poster and the logo for the tour were developed by Chase Design Group, who wanted to make the logo as aesthetic as possible. They developed a custom icon and type of logo to convey the "unique and ethereal qualities" of Madonna's show, which was described by the group's founder Margo Chase as "a multilayered musical and spiritual journey through diverse worlds". Chase commented that since "Madonna is a student of Kabbalah, she requested that we include references to that body of knowledge". The resulting logo and poster included both Arabic and Hebrew references. A number of designs were prepared by Chase and the one ultimately chosen by Madonna made it to the main poster of the show, which featured her face-shot from the "What It Feels Like for a Girl" video.

Concert synopsis 

The show was divided into four different thematic acts: Rock 'n' Roll Punk Girl, Geisha Girl, Cyber Cowgirl, and Spanish Girl/Ghetto Girl. It began with a performance of "Drowned World/Substitute for Love"; Madonna entered the stage amidst billows of dry ice and sang atop a rising platform. She wore a sleeveless black top, crossover top with one net sleeve, jeans with zips and bondage straps, a studded dog collar and a tartan kilt. A high-energy performance of "Impressive Instant" followed. It found the singer surrounded by dancers wearing gas masks and encased in rolls of black mesh. Madonna then played electric guitar for "Candy Perfume Girl". Afterwards,  "Beautiful Stranger" was performed by the singer, Niki Haris and Donna De Lory; the backdrops displayed scenes from Austin Powers: The Spy Who Shagged Me and psychedelic fluorescent whirls. Towards the end, they were joined by a lost technician. The section finished with "Ray of Light", which had the singer dancing energetically across the stage. Monte Pittman played guitar while the screens showed an extended version of the song's music video.

The Geisha Girl act began with a video interlude of "Paradise (Not For Me)", showing Madonna as a geisha. Also present were nearly naked dancers who hung upside down from the ceiling. As the video ended, the dancers stood in front of the stage and opened their mouths, which were lit from inside. The singer then emerged in a short black wig and a hand-painted black kimono with fifty-two-feet long red sleeves, to sing "Frozen". A short intro of "Open Your Heart" led to "Nobody's Perfect", where Madonna was portrayed to be sacrificed for her sins. This was followed by "Mer Girl", which turned into the fast-action, ninja/samurai martial arts battle performance of "Sky Fits Heaven". A video of a beaten, bruised Madonna played on the main screen during this final part. The singer then proceeded to grab a shotgun and pretended to shoot one of her dancers. A remix interlude of "What It Feels Like for a Girl" closed the section; dancers in anime and manga inspired costumes swung from wires as the backdrops featured interspersed footage from Satoshi Kon's 1997 film Perfect Blue and hentai anime Urotsukidōji.

"I Deserve It" opened the Cyber Cowgirl segment. Madonna, who wore a cowgirl outfit with chaps, sat on a bale of hay and played the acoustic guitar. "Don't Tell Me" had her and the dancers line dancing, like in the song's music video. "Human Nature" featured a bondage-themed choreography with a lasso and, towards the end, the singer sensually rode a mechanical bull. Afterwards, she addressed the audience in a mocking southern accent and sang a cannibalism-themed song titled "The Funny Song". "Secret" was performed with acoustic guitar and footage of riverside baptism, Sufi dervish ceremonies and Buddhist prayers on the backdrops. Madonna finished the section with an acoustic "Gone", replaced with "You'll See" on certain US concerts.

The final act, Spanish Girl/Ghetto Girl, began with an instrumental interlude of Don't Cry for Me Argentina; several dancers did a Tango number with lit candles placed along the side of the stage. Madonna then emerged on top of a rotating leather podium to perform "Lo Que Siente la Mujer", dressed in black trousers and a backless black dress. For "La Isla Bonita", the singer once again played guitar and was accompanied by flamenco dancing. A mash-up of "Holiday" and Stardust's "Music Sounds Better With You" (1998) was then performed by Madonna, Haris and De Lory. The final number was "Music", and featured the singer and all the dancers. Confetti fell from the roof while images of her past music videos flashed onscreen behind her. The phrase "The End" appeared on the screens, and signified the show was over.

Following the September 11 attacks, certain changes were made to the final Los Angeles concerts: Madonna wore an American flag as kilt during the opening segment as a display of patriotism. The closing of "Mer Girl" omitted the shooting; the singer instead put the shotgun down, hugged the dancer and they left the stage together. "The Funny Song" was removed; all the dancers joined in for "Holiday", which usually only featured Madonna, Haris and De Lory.

Critical reception 

The Drowned World Tour received generally positive reviews from critics. Rafael Estefanía from BBC Mundo gave the opening show in Barcelona a glowing review; he said the singer had offered "one of the best shows in a long time", and that her stage presence remained "as explosive as ever". Another positive review came from El País, who described it as one of the most "spectacular" and "shocking" concerts to take place in Barcelona. According to ABC News, Drowned World "took [Madonna's] reputation for entertaining above and beyond literally: one routine found her flying above the stage suspended by trapeze wires". For The Independents Simon O'Hagan it proved that "as a solo artist, Madonna is without equal [...] her desire to put on a spectacle, not just a concert, creates challenges that have extended the boundaries of what a rock'n'pop tour can achieve". He concluded it was her "most ambitious and daring" tour. A writer from Argentinean newspaper Clarin said that the tour "reaffirmed [Madonna's] Queen of Pop title".

The show's technical aspects also garnered praise. El País lauded the "surprising and suggestive display" of technology, as well as the "shapeshifting stage capable of turning into almost anything". Similarly, Michael Hubbard from online magazine musicOMH highlighted the "stunning" stage setup and "superb" lighting. Simon Price, from The Independent, deemed it "a triumph of hydraulics, bungee rope acrobatics and cutting-edge choreography". MTV's Corey Moss concluded that "music might make the world go round, but costumes and theatrics make it more fun. Nobody knows this better than the Material Girl". Slants Sal Cinquemani felt the "technically flawless" show was "further evidence of the Big M’s perfectionist blond ambition" and concluded that "[Madonna] is still unmatched in her ability to lift cultural iconography into the mainstream". On the contrary, Rafael Estefanía expressed that "the technological visual feast sometimes overshadowed the music itself", an opinion that was shared by El País, and Entertainment Weeklys John McAlley.

NMEs Alex Needham called the tour a tribute to her "incredible graft, magnetic appeal and, above all, her supreme ability at making pop music"; he also said that if other musicians were to put "a tenth of the creative energy" into concerts as Madonna, "we would all be a lot better off". On a similar note, Phil Gallo from Variety opined that the "mesmerizing and confident" Drowned World Tour "puts to shame any singer who thinks she might have a shot at Ms. Ciccone's pop throne". Michael Hubbard further added: "you’d struggle to find a better show [...] and you’d find it difficult to find a mainstream artist who can command near-universal respect for anything like as long as this fine lady". Writing for The Guardian, Alex Petridis explained that "her contemporaries are either in reduced circumstances or languishing in the middle of the road [...] Madonna, however, still twists hip dancefloor trends to her own design". He ultimately concluded that "with its perfect dance routines, special effects, devoted audience and hint of bullish arrogance, the Drowned World show befits the world's most famous woman". For John McAlley, it wasn't up to par to 1990's Blond Ambition World Tour but was better than The Girlie Show; "[Drowned World] offers plenty of artiness, attitude, eye candy, and its own brand of ambition" [...] there are plenty of reasons to bow at this artist's feat".

Alberto Armendáriz from Argentinean newspaper La Nación felt that the only "criticizable" aspect was that "the whole affair [was] so tightly scripted, it left no room for spontaneity or interactions" between the singer and the audience. Jon Pareles, from The New York Times, said the singer's voice sounded "fuller and smoother" than on previous tours, particularly in performances such as "I Deserve It" (2000) and "You'll See" (1995). Nonetheless, he criticized her "arrogance" and use of profanities. "[She] represents self-love backed by plenty of gym time and a whole troupe of devoted flunkies – enough to delight an audience she only seems to disdain.  Music makes the people come together,  – together, that is, if Madonna is in charge", Pareles concluded. From Spin, Joshua Clover criticized its lack of a "coherent story line". A negative review came from Ethan Brown, writing for New York magazine; he felt that "limp" performances such as "Nobody's Perfect" (2000) and "I Deserve It", "didn't live up to her attitude". Brown also said that, despite "few stunning visual moments", the concert didn't capture "the sense of purpose" of the artist's past tours. "Madonna is a frustratingly small stage presence, too, mostly standing motionless or strumming rudimentary chords on an acoustic guitar [...] the music was equally airless", he concluded his review. 

The lack of the singer's 1980s songs was met with criticism: VH1's Christopher Rosa opined that "the sheer lack of classic hits was a letdown for audiences, not to mention the fact that [Madonna] seemed icier than ever". On his ranking of Madonna's tours, in June 2021, The Odyssey's Rocco Papa placed Drowned World on the 11th position; "while it proved that she still had it after giving birth to two kids, it lacked warmth and light [...] [and] many hits from her back catalogue". For The Guardian, Caroline Sullivan wrote that the tour's lack of "classics" would disappoint the singer's "die-hards", and that "no right-thinking person would rather hear 'Candy Perfume Girl' than 'Like a Virgin'". DVD Movie Guide's Colin Jacobson remarked that anyone who "expected to see a greatest hits concert left sorely disappointed", but praised the singer for creating the show "she wanted to do, not the one she thought would be the safe choice". 

Gina Vivinetto from The Advocate said that, even though Madonna ignored most of her "80s hits", she "made up for it by showing off a much stronger singing voice". Alex Petridis also defended the singer's decision to focus on the new material; "it's a pleasingly defiant gesture no other stadium-filler could match – imagine the Rolling Stones only playing songs from their last two albums and try not to shudder". On a similar note, Sal Cinquemani felt album cuts such as "Candy Perfume Girl" translated into "edgier numbers", and also complemented the concert for being aimed at "true fans—critics (and hits) be damned". Finally, Alex Needham concluded that, even though the lack of Madonna's classic songs was "criminal", the Drowned World Tour "couldn’t have been better". It was nominated for Major Tour of the Year and Most Creative Stage Production at the 2001 Pollstar awards, but lost to U2's Elevation Tour.

Commercial reception 
Dates for the Drowned World Tour were limited to cities in Europe and North America. For many weeks prior, Arthur Fogel from Live Nation attempted to book dates in Toronto's Air Canada Centre, between the Sunrise, Atlanta, and Detroit gigs, though no free bookings were available; it became Madonna's first tour to completely skip over Canada. The first Barcelona concert attracted 18,000 people. Initially, only one concert was confirmed at London's Earls Court Exhibition Centre, but after the 16,000 tickets sold out in just fifteen minutes, promoters added five more dates, which were completely sold out in six hours; prices ranged between £40 and £85. With a million hits on the official website within the first 10 minutes, and an estimated 30 million attempts through ticket hotlines – which were attended by 265 operators – Madonna made history by having her London shows among the fastest selling of all time.

In the United States, all concerts sold out in hours, with the four Los Angeles dates selling out in just seventeen minutes. With forty-seven concerts, and over 730,000 tickets sold in Europe and the United States, it was reported to have earned US$76.8 million ($ million in  dollars), averaging at $1.6 million ($ million in  dollars) per show; Drowned World became the highest-grossing concert tour of 2001 by a solo artist, as well as the fourth highest-grossing overall, only behind U2, 'N Sync, and the Backstreet Boys.

Broadcast and recording 

The concert on August 26, at The Palace of Auburn Hills, was filmed professionally and broadcast live on HBO as Madonna Live: The Drowned World Tour. It marked the third time Madonna worked with the network following the Blond Ambition and Girlie Show broadcasts; Nancy Geller, senior VP of original programming for HBO, stated that "it's a thrill for us to have Madonna back, because we know it is going to be a spectacular show, with that combination of her amazing talent and extravagant style". Hamish Hamilton directed the special, while production was in charge of Marty Callner. It scored 5.7 million viewers, and became the network's third-highest-rated prime-time concert special since 1997. It received two nominations at the 54th Primetime Emmy Awards: Outstanding Costumes for a Variety, Nonfiction, or Reality Programming and Outstanding Choreography, and won Best TV Concert at the 2002 AOL TV Viewer Awards.

The special was released on VHS and DVD under the title Drowned World Tour 2001 on November 13, 2001, the same day as Madonna's second greatest hits album, GHV2. Captured with a 14-camera High Definition shoot, it was presented in an aspect ratio of 1.33:1 on the single-sided, double-layered DVD; due to those dimensions, the image was not enhanced for 16:9 televisions. The photographs used on the video's packaging were taken by Madonna's personal friend, actress Rosie O'Donnell. Following its release, the video received mixed response from critics, who praised the sound quality but criticized the poor image. In the United States, it became Madonna's fifth number one on the Billboard Top Music Videos chart, and was certified platinum by the Recording Industry Association of America (RIAA) for shipment of more than 100,000 copies.

Set list 
Set list, samples and notes adapted per Madonna's official website, the notes and track listing of Drowned World Tour 2001, and additional sources.

Act 1: Rock 'n' Roll Punk Girl
 "Drowned World/Substitute for Love" 
 "Impressive Instant"
 "Candy Perfume Girl"
 "Beautiful Stranger" 
 "Ray of Light" 
Act 2: Geisha Girl
 "Paradise (Not for Me)" 
 "Frozen"
 "Nobody's Perfect" 
 "Mer Girl" 
"Sky Fits Heaven"
 "Mer Girl" 
 "What It Feels Like for a Girl" 
Act 3: Cyber Cowgirl
 "I Deserve It"
 "Don't Tell Me"
 "Human Nature"
 "The Funny Song"
 "Secret"
 "Gone"
Act 4: Spanish Girl/Ghetto Girl
 "Don't Cry for Me Argentina" 
 "Lo Que Siente La Mujer" 
 "La Isla Bonita"
 "Holiday" 
 "Music" 

Notes
 On certain US shows, "You'll See" (1995) was performed instead of "Gone".
 Following the September 11 attacks, "The Funny Song" was removed from the set list.

Shows

Cancelled dates

Notes

Personnel 
Adapted from the Drowned World Tour 2001 program.

Band 
Madonna – creator, vocals, guitar
Niki Haris – vocals
Donna De Lory – vocals
Stuart Price – musical director, keyboards, guitar
Michael McKnight – programmer, keyboards
Marcus Brown – keyboards
Monte Pittman – guitar
Ron Powell – percussions
Steve Sidelnyk – drums

Dancers 
Christian Vincent – head dancer
Ruthy Inchaustegui – dancer
Nito Larioza – dancer
Tamara Levinson – dancer
Marlyn Ortiz – dancer
Anthony Jay Rodriguez – dancer
Jamal Story – dancer
Kemba Shannon – dancer
Eko Supriyanto – dancer
Jull Weber – dancer
Addie Yungmee- dancer

Choreographers 
Jamie King – choreographer
Alex Magno – choreographer
Kelly Parker – assistant choreographer
Debra Brown – aerial choreographer
Leslie DeWhurst – assistant aerial choreographer
Stefanie Roos – associate choreographer
Taimak Guerreillo – Martial arts coordinator
Ho Sung Pak – assistant to Martial arts coordinator

Wardrobe 
Jean Paul Gaultier – designer
Arianne Phillips – designer
Dean and Dan Caten – designer

Crew 
Hamish Hamilton – broadcast director
Jamie King – stage production director
Joyce Fleming – creative technical consultant
Tif'nie Olson – assistant to director
William Orbit – engineer
Mirwais Ahmadzaï – engineer
Pat McCarthy – engineer
Mark "Spike" Stent – engineer
Caresse Henry – artist management
Shari Goldschmidt – business management
Richard Feldstein – business management
LeeAnn Hard – business management
Liz Rosenberg – publicist
Chris Littleton – tour manager
Arianne Phillips – stylist
Luigi Murenu – stylist
Rita Marmo – stylist
Klexius Kolby – make-up
Julie Harris – make-up
Joseph kale – art director
Peter Morse lighting director
Jake Davies – sound design
Carol Dodds – video director
Edwin Stern – yoga instructor
Kevin Reagan – tour book design
Rosie O'Donnell – cover photo

References

Bibliography

External links 

Madonna.com > Tours > Drowned World Tour

Madonna concert tours
2001 concert tours